Mihailo Jovanović (born 1972) is a Serbian engineer and politician serving as minister of information and telecommunications since 2022.

Early life 
Mihailo Jovanović was born in 1972 in Belgrade, Socialist Republic of Serbia, Socialist Federal Republic of Yugoslavia. He graduated and earned his master's degree from the School of Electrical Engineering at the University of Belgrade. He received his doctorate in topics of economics in 2012.

Career 
He began his career at Pošta Srbije, where he worked in telecommunications. He also previously worked at Telekom Srbija. He was later appointed director of the Office for Information Technologies and Electronic Administration of the Government of Serbia in April 2017. He is a close associate of Ana Brnabić.

Minister of Information and Telecommunications 
It was announced on 24 October 2022 that Jovanović would serve as minister of information and telecommunications in the third cabinet of Ana Brnabić. He was sworn in on 26 October.

Personal life 
Jovanović is married and has two children. He received two awards, in 2002 and 2022 respectively, due to his work on information technologies. He is a member of the Chamber of Engineers of Serbia.

References 

1972 births
Living people
University of Belgrade School of Electrical Engineering alumni
Government ministers of Serbia
Serbian Progressive Party politicians
Politicians from Belgrade
21st-century Serbian politicians
Independent politicians in Serbia